Adulis distrigalis is a species of snout moth in the genus Adulis. It was described by Ragonot in 1891. It is found in Madagascar.

References

Moths described in 1891
Pyralinae
Moths of Madagascar
Taxa named by Émile Louis Ragonot